Joseph Loua (born 15 November 1976) is a retired Guinean sprinter who specialized in the 200 metres.

He won a silver medal in this event at the 1996 African Championships. He also entered the World Championships in 1995, 1997 and 1999 as well as the Olympic Games in 1996 and 2000, but never reached the final round.

References

External links

1976 births
Living people
Guinean male sprinters
Athletes (track and field) at the 1996 Summer Olympics
Athletes (track and field) at the 2000 Summer Olympics
Olympic athletes of Guinea